Charlie George is a British writer and comedian from Swindon. In 2019, she won "The Comedy Bloomers LGBTQ+ New Comedian of the Year" and was a runner-up in both So You Think You're Funny and Funny Women. As a scriptwriter, she has written for British comedy shows Have I Got News for You, Death to 2020, Death to 2021, Blankety Blank, Joe Lycett's Got Your Back and Frankie Boyle's New World Order.

In 2020, she was one of a select group of 14 new writers selected by Penguin Random House UK for their WriteNow editorial programme.

In 2022, she is participating of the Edinburgh Fringe Festival with the compilation show "Clandestina: Queer Comedy Triple Bill", along with fellow comedian Victoria Olsina (winner of LGBTQ+ Comedian of the Year 2022).

Accolades
 Finalist, Leicester Square New Comedian of the Year, 2018
Winner, The Comedy Bloomers LGBTQ+ New Comedian of the Year, 2019
Runner-up, So You Think You're Funny, 2019
Runner-up, Funny Women, 2019
Finalist, Pride's Got Talent, 2019
Nominee, Chortle Awards Newcomer of the Year, 2020

Credits

References

External links

English stand-up comedians
People from Swindon
English women comedians
British LGBT comedians
British people of South Asian descent
Year of birth missing (living people)
20th-century births
Living people